The 2015 Irwin Tools Night Race was a NASCAR Sprint Cup Series race held on August 22, 2015, at Bristol Motor Speedway in Bristol, Tennessee. Contested over 500 laps on the .533 mile (.858 km) concrete short track, it was the 24th race of the 2015 NASCAR Sprint Cup Series season. Joey Logano won the race, making this his second consecutive and overall at the track and his third of the season. Kevin Harvick finished second for the tenth time in the season while Denny Hamlin, Jimmie Johnson and Clint Bowyer rounded out the top five.

Hamlin won the pole for the race and led 54 laps on his way to a third-place finish. Kyle Busch led a race high of 192 laps on his way to an eighth-place finish. The race had 14 lead changes among five different drivers, as well as eight caution flag periods for 52 laps.

This was the 11th career victory for Joey Logano, third of the season, second at Bristol Motor Speedway and 12th at the track for Team Penske. Despite winning the race, he left Bristol trailing Kevin Harvick by 43-points in the drivers points standings. Ford left Bristol trailing Toyota by one-point for second in the manufacturer standings and Chevrolet by 71 for the points lead.

The Irwin Tools Nights Race was carried by NBC Sports on the cable/satellite NBCSN network for the American television audience. The radio broadcast for the race was carried by the Performance Racing Network and Sirius XM NASCAR Radio.

Report

Background

Bristol Motor Speedway, formerly known as Bristol International Raceway and Bristol Raceway, is a NASCAR short track venue located in Bristol, Tennessee. Constructed in 1960, it held its first NASCAR race on July 30, 1961. Despite its short length, Bristol is among the most popular tracks on the NASCAR schedule because of its distinct features, which include extraordinarily steep banking, an all concrete surface, two pit roads, and stadium-like seating. It has also been named one of the loudest NASCAR tracks.

Kevin Harvick entered Bristol with a 48–point lead over Joey Logano. Dale Earnhardt Jr. entered 82 back. Martin Truex Jr. entered 111 back. Brad Keselowski entered 112 back.

Entry list
The entry list for the Irwin Tools Night Race was released on Monday, August 17 at 11:17 a.m. Eastern time. Forty-six cars were entered for the race. All but two cars were entered in the previous week's race at Michigan. The only driver change for this race was the No. 33 Hillman-Circle Sport LLC Chevrolet which was driven by Mike Bliss.

Practice

First practice

Towards the tail-end of the session, Martin Truex Jr. blew a right-front tire and slammed the wall exiting turn 2. The damage done to the left-front control arm forced him to switch to his backup car. Because this change took place prior to qualifying, he won't start the race from the rear of the field.

Final practice

Qualifying

"Our FedEx Ground Camry obviously was very fast that last round and Dave (Rogers, crew chief) made the great adjustments to it to pick up the speed and I think that hopefully we’ll have something that we can race with them tomorrow night,” Hamlin said. “The first round just got loose and that kind of put us behind the whole time," Kevin Harvick said after qualifying seventh. "Other than that the car drove pretty good, really throughout every round. Had a little bit of trouble with all the engine stuff shutting off at the end of the straightaway so that was definitely hurting us." “All of our cars have had good speed today, we just missed the setup there a little bit for qualifying and couldn’t really fix it from the pit box," said Matt Kenseth after qualifying 13th. "We got the best lap we could out of it – wish we could have made it to the last round there. Just didn’t quite have enough in it.” "We didn’t qualify very good here the last time we were here and heck, I think this time we were worse than we were the last time," Jeff Gordon said after qualifying 24th for his final start at Bristol. "But we raced really good. I thought our race runs looked decent today. It’s hard to pass. The groove is up top there, so I was hoping we were going to qualify better than this, especially with this pretty awesome Rainbow paint scheme that Axalta has this weekend for us. But, it just wasn’t meant to be. I don’t know. We were just really struggling when we put it into qualifying trim.” Jeb Burton, Travis Kvapil and Reed Sorenson failed to qualify for the race.

Qualifying results

Race

First half

Start

Under a clear East Tennessee evening sky, Denny Hamlin led the field to the green flag at 7:52 p.m. Starting on the bottom line, which isn't the norm at Bristol, he shot ahead of teammate Kyle Busch to lead the first lap. By lap 15, Hamlin caught the tail-end of the field and completed the short track conveyor belt. By lap 18, Busch ran down his teammate and pressured him for the lead. Eventually, the No. 18 Toyota used the lap traffic to pass the No. 11 and take the lead on lap 28. The lapped traffic allowed Kyle to pull away from Denny in the ensuing laps. A. J. Allmendinger bumped Paul Menard in turn 3 and about sent the No. 27 car spinning in front of the race leader, but he saved his car and the race continued. Debris in turn 3 brought out the first caution of the race on lap 52. Kyle Busch and Denny Hamlin swapped the lead on pit road with the former pitting on the backstretch. It was ultimately Busch whom exited pit road with the lead. Ryan Blaney and Danica Patrick were tagged for speeding on pit road and restarted the race from the rear of the field.

The race restarted on lap 58. He shot ahead of Kyle Larson on the outside line and drove away from the field followed closely by teammate Denny Hamlin. He too was caught off by lapped traffic and Busch drove away. Matt Kenseth was running fourth when he blew his engine on lap 111. “It broke in the middle of the straightaway – it had that hop and that noise that it makes when you know you dropped a valve,” Kenseth explained. “Unfortunate, but man these guys at TRD (Toyota Racing Development) have been doing such an awesome job, we’ve had so much power and everything has been really reliable here the last year and a half. Things like this happen every once in a while. It’s a short night. Felt like we were really competitive – we were one or two adjustments away from where we needed to be, but I thought our Dollar General Camry had good speed.” The second caution of the race flew on lap 126 for a single-car wreck in turn 4. Exiting turn 2, Kyle Larson – who changed just right-side tires under the first caution – cut down his left-front tire and slammed the wall in turn 3. Kyle Busch and Denny Hamlin swapped the lead on pit road pitting on opposite pit roads. This time, it was Hamlin who beat his teammate off pit road. Kevin Harvick was tagged for his crew being over the wall too soon and restarted the race from the rear of the field.

Second quarter

The race restarted on lap 133. Again deviating from recent Bristol norm, Denny Hamlin restarted on the bottom line and shot ahead of his teammate. The third caution of the race flew on lap 146 for a single-car wreck on the front stretch. Exiting turn 2, A. J. Allmendinger came down across the nose of Ricky Stenhouse Jr., slid down the track and slammed the inside wall.

The race restarted on lap 152. Teammate Kyle Busch drove by Denny Hamlin on the top side to take back the lead on lap 156. Hamlin pulled back up to him in the next eight laps, but was unable to get by him. Eventually, Busch began to pull away from the rest of the lead cars. Being caught being the lapped car of Josh Wise allowed Joey Logano to drive up to his outside, but pulled out in front and continued leading. Logano powered underneath Busch after he made slight contact with the wall to take the lead on lap 226. Debris in turn 3 brought out the fourth caution of the race on lap 250. Carl Edwards exited pit road with the lead. Justin Allgaier was tagged for speeding on pit road and restarted the race from the rear of the field.

Second half

Halfway

The race restarted on lap 258. Kyle Busch drove outside teammate Edwards to retake the lead on lap 282. Unfortunately, he was unable to build a gap as he was caught in heavy lap traffic. Carl reeled in Kyle to drive by him and take the lead on lap 304. He pulled to a one-second lead over Joey Logano. As is normal for Bristol, the lapped traffic slowed him down enough to allow Logano to reel in Edwards. David Ragan made contact with Kurt Busch and sent him into the turn 1 wall. Kyle Busch was running third when he made an unscheduled stop on lap 344. Logano ducked underneath Edwards and used the lapped car of Dale Earnhardt Jr. as a pick to take the lead on lap 347. The lapped traffic allowed Carl to return the favor and retake the lead on lap 352. He cut down a tire, hit pit road from the lead and handed it back to Joey Logano. The fifth caution of the race flew on lap 359 for a single-car wreck on the front stretch. Exiting turn 4, Kyle Larson cut down his right-front tire and slammed the wall hard in turn 4. Kevin Harvick was tagged for speeding on pit road and restarted the race from the rear of the field.

The race restarted on lap 368. The sixth caution of the race flew with 130 laps to go for a single-spin on the backstretch. In a classic Bristol accordion effect exiting turn 2, Jimmie Johnson got loose, came down on David Ragan, got turned by Clint Bowyer, sent spinning down the track and slammed the inside wall. "The 48 (Johnson) jumped on my outside and we were really good on the bottom and it kind of surprised me by getting out there and he held me tight coming off of Turn 2 and then I guess the 15 (Bowyer) got a little bit of a run and there just wasn’t enough room for the three of us," Ragan said after the race. "That's the way things happen at Bristol sometimes. It's unfortunate. Our Aaron's Dream Machine was really fast and we had a chance to win. It's uncalled for to get wrecked and to be involved in a wreck like that but all in all just one of those racing things." "You hate to have that good of a car -- have two good cars and the last person you want to get into and have trouble with is your teammate," Bowyer said after the race. "I'm sick to death about that. We had two top-five cars and MWR really needed that run. With that being said we desperately needed a solid run right there. I mean obviously you're hungry for a win with this organization given everything it had and I drove my ass off we just come up short."

Fourth quarter
The race restarted with 121 laps to go. The seventh caution of the race flew with 117 laps to go for a single-car wreck on the front stretch. Exiting turn 4, Ricky Stenhouse Jr. got loose, overcorrected, hit Martin Truex Jr. and hit the outside wall. Greg Biffle was tagged for speeding on pit road and restarted the race from the rear of the field.

The race restarted with 110 laps to go. Jeff Gordon was running fifth when he made an unscheduled stop for a loose wheel with 93 laps to go. Debris on the backstretch brought out the eighth caution of the race with 71 laps to go. Brad Keselowski opted not to pit under the caution and assumed the lead. Kyle Busch was tagged for speeding on the pit road and restarted the race from the rear of the field. “It’s frustrating,” Adam Stevens said. “We put another car on the track that’s capable of winning and it’s tough to do. We’ve been able to do it I don’t know how many weeks in a row. We had a race-winning car at Watkins Glen and Pocono and just keep coming up short. This one’s on us. We made a mistake at Pocono, we weren’t aggressive enough at Watkins Glen and now just make a mistake on pit road. We had a loose wheel and we battled back from that and then you speed on the last stop – you can’t win if you speed on the last stop. That’s all there is to it. (NASCAR) told us that we were speeding in section five – our pit box is in section five. You can’t speed if you’re stopped on pit road. Maybe they meant to say a different number, I don’t know. But there is no earthly way that you can speed in the segment that your pit stall is in, it’s not possible.”

The race restarted with 63 laps to go. Joey Logano shot ahead of his teammate to retake the lead. For the final 50 laps, he and Kevin Harvick dueled with one another for the top spot. While Logano was running the bottom line to get away, Harvick continued to ride around the top lane of the track to reel in Logano. Joey began to pull away with 25 laps remaining. However, he began dealing with lapped traffic again in the final 20 laps. It was this lapped traffic that allowed Kevin to reel the lead back to him with 12 laps left in the race. He finally pulled to within a car-length of Logano with four laps to go. Kevin Harvick was unable to catch Joey Logano on the final lap as he went on to score the victory at Bristol.

Post-race

Driver comments

“It was kind of interesting to watch it in the mirror,” Logano said of Harvick trying to pass him in the closing laps. “I was watching him drive in and I was like, ‘He’s going to get me eventually,’ so I just wanted to make sure I stayed at least three or four car lengths up on him so he didn't get to me.”

"He was just one step ahead of me in traffic,” Harvick explained after finishing runner-up for the 10th time this season.  “I couldn't get my car to rotate across the center like I needed it to, and every time I tried to force it would snap the back out. He was able to go in really high and before the center of the corner drive down the corner and I was just having to wait just a split second to be able to put the throttle back down, and I couldn't do that, that huge diamond all the way to the bottom like he could, and that was really beneficial for him through traffic, and I kind of had to just part throttle it through the center and grind the tires away through the center to the corner and just hope that they were going to lift, but he was able to get those huge runs up off the exit of the corner and just stayed one step ahead of me through traffic I felt like, and in clean air we probably were a little faster, but it didn't really matter.  I had to be in front of him to show that. All in all, he was just one step ahead of me in traffic.”

“This was a big night for us,” Bowyer said after finishing fifth.  “We needed this. Driver got us behind last weekend after Michigan, but man, when you step up to the plate like this and you’re running at the level that it takes to be a part of the championship caliber elite group like you have in the Chase. You don’t want to just go into that Chase and be a part of it and be the first guy out, you want to go into that Chase with some confidence and momentum and some good runs where you can maybe go a few rounds in there.”

Race results

Race statistics
14 lead changes among 5 different drivers
8 cautions for 52 laps
Time of race: 2 hours, 45 minute, 2 seconds
Average speed: 
Joey Logano took home $365,198 in winnings

Race awards
 Coors Light Pole Award: Denny Hamlin (14.602)
 3M Lap Leader: Kyle Busch (192 laps)
 American Ethanol Green Flag Restart Award: Joey Logano
 Duralast Brakes "Bake In The Race" Award: Kyle Busch
 Freescale "Wide Open": Kevin Harvick
 Ingersoll Rand Power Move: Aric Almirola (2 positions)
 MAHLE Clevite Engine Builder of the Race: Toyota Racing Development #11
 Mobil 1 Driver of the Race: Joey Logano (137.8 driver rating)
 Moog Steering and Suspension Problem Solver of The Race: Dale Earnhardt Jr. (crew chief Greg Ives (0.123 seconds))
 NASCAR Sprint Cup Leader Bonus: No winner: rolls over to $210,000 at next event
 Sherwin-Williams Fastest Lap: Kyle Busch (Lap 59, 15.293)
 Sunoco Rookie of The Race: Brett Moffitt

Media

Television
NBC Sports covered the race on the television side. Rick Allen, one–time Bristol winner Jeff Burton and Steve Letarte had the call in the booth for the race. Dave Burns, Mike Massaro, Marty Snider and Kelli Stavast handled pit road on the television side.

Radio
PRN had the radio call for the race, which was simulcast on Sirius XM NASCAR Radio. Doug Rice, Mark Garrow and Wendy Venturini called the race from the booth when the field was racing down the front stretch. Rob Albright called the race from atop the suites in turn 3 when the field was racing down the backstretch. Brad Gillie, Brett McMillan, Jim Noble and Steve Richards worked pit road on the radio side.

Standings after the race

Drivers' Championship standings

Manufacturers' Championship standings

Note: Only the first sixteen positions are included for the driver standings.

References

Irwin Tools Night Race
Irwin Tools Night Race
NASCAR races at Bristol Motor Speedway